The seventh and final season of Without a Trace began airing on September 23, 2008 and ended on May 19, 2009. There are 24 episodes in this season. On the morning of the series finale, CBS declined to renew the show for an eighth season, along with The Unit.

For the 2008-09 U.S. television season the seventh season of Without a Trace ranked 18th with an average of 12.97 million viewers.

The seventh season was not released on DVD in Region 1 until April 29, 2014.

Cast
 Anthony LaPaglia as Federal Bureau of Investigation Missing Persons Unit Supervisory Special Agent John Michael "Jack" Malone
 Poppy Montgomery as FBI MPU SA Samantha "Sam" Spade
 Marianne Jean-Baptiste as FBI MPU SA Agent Vivian "Viv" Johnson
 Enrique Murciano as FBI MPU SA Danny Taylor
 Roselyn Sánchez as FBI MPU SA Elena Delgado
 Eric Close as FBI MPU SA Martin Fitzgerald

Episodes

References

Without a Trace seasons
2008 American television seasons
2009 American television seasons